Bonghwa County (Bonghwa-gun) is a county in North Gyeongsang Province, South Korea. It lies inland, at the northern edge of the province, and borders Gangwon province to the north. To the east it is bounded by Yeongyang and Uljin counties, to the south by Andong, and to the west by Yeongju. The county is ringed by the Taebaek and Sobaek Mountains, the highest of which is Taebaek-san itself, at more than 1500 meters above sea level.

Bonghwa is connected to the national rail grid by the Yeongdong Line, which stops at Bonghwa station on its way between Yeongju and Gangneung.  The Yeongdong Line, which is not known for its speed, stops at a total of 13 stations as it winds through Bonghwa, before ambling north into the next province.

Korean National Treasure No. 201, a rock-carved seated Buddhist statue, is located in Bukji-ri, Murya-myeon.

Famous people from Bonghwa include director Kim Ki-duk. The county is also the setting of the 2008 documentary film Old Partner, which has won numerous awards for its portrayal of rural life.

Administrative divisions

Bonghwa is divided into ten primary divisions:  one eup (large village) and nine rural districts (myeon).

The eup and myeon are further divided into numerous small villages (ri).

Climate
Bonghwa has a monsoon-influenced humid continental climate (Köppen: Dwa) with cold, dry winters and hot, rainy summers.

Twin towns – sister cities
Bonghwa is twinned with:

  Gangdong-gu, South Korea
  Bucheon, South Korea
  Yeonje-gu, South Korea
  Tongchuan, China
  Selenge Province, Mongolia

See also
 Geography of South Korea
 Baekdudaegan

References

External links

County government website

 
Counties of North Gyeongsang Province